The 2010–11 season in Honduran Liga Nacional was divided into two tournaments (Apertura and Clausura) and determined the 57th and 58th champions in the history of the league.  It also provided two berths for the 2011–12 CONCACAF Champions League.  The league had a reserve tournament for the first time in history with players between 15 and 20 years old.

2010–11 teams

 C.D. Necaxa is from Tegucigalpa but will play their home games at Danlí.
 Real C.D. España is from San Pedro Sula but played their home games at Choloma for the Apertura tournament.

Team information

1 Due to disputes with the city, Real España played its home games in Choloma and Puerto Cortés during the Apertura tournament.

Apertura
The Apertura tournament started on 7 August 2010 at Estadio Nilmo Edwards in La Ceiba with the game between Vida and Real España.

Regular season

Standings

Results
 As of 20 November 2010

Final round

Semifinals

Victoria vs Olimpia

 Olimpia won 3–0 on aggregate score.

Marathón vs Real España

 Real España won 4–2 on aggregate score.

Final

Real España vs Olimpia

 Real España won 3–2 on aggregate score.

Top goalscorers
 As of 11 December 2010
 12 goals:

  Jerry Bengtson (Vida)

 11 goals:

  Saul Martínez (Victoria)

 9 goals:

  Rony Flores (Marathón)
  Douglas Mattoso (Real España)

 8 goals:

  Elroy Smith (Deportes Savio)
  Luis Lobo (Real España)
  Ramiro Bruschi (Olimpia)

 7 goals:

  Rubén Licona (Necaxa)

 6 goals:

  Randy Diamond (Marathón)
  Carlos Días (Olimpia)

 5 goals:

  Héctor Flores (Hispano)
  Georgie Welcome (Motagua)

 4 goals:

  Mario Martínez (Real España)
  Milton Ruiz (Vida)
  Mauricio Copete (Olimpia)
  Pompilio Cacho (Hispano)
  Christian Pereira (Platense)
  Christian Martínez (Real España)
  Michel Rivera (Platense)
  Luis Rodas (Necaxa)

 3 goals:

  Edilson Pereira (Deportes Savio)
  Yobani Avila (Real España)
  Víctor Ortiz (Victoria)
  Roger Rojas (Olimpia)
  Elmer Zelaya (Victoria)
  Marcelo Lopes (Platense)
  Juan Mejía (Deportes Savio)
  Juan Cárcamo (Platense)

 2 goals:

  Rubén Matamoros (Necaxa)
  Claudio Cardozo (Marathón)
  Maynor Martínez (Real España)
  Víctor Morales (Hispano)
  Francisco Pavón (Vida)
  José Velásquez (Victoria)
  Boniek García (Olimpia)
  Luis Guzmán (Motagua)
  Sergio Bica (Real España)
  Carlos Solórzano (Deportes Savio)
  Jorge Claros (Motagua)
  Orvin Paz (Marathón)
  Alexander López (Olimpia)
  Shannon Welcome (Motagua)
  Héctor Amarilla (Marathón)
  Oscar Torlacoff (Hispano)
  Reynaldo Tilguath (Olimpia)
  Samir Arzú (Victoria)
  Alfredo Mejía (Real España)
  Edder Delgado (Real España)
  Amado Guevara (Motagua)
  Harrison Róches (Platense)
  Danilo Turcios (Olimpia)
  Deon McCauley (Deportes Savio)
  Walter Hernández (Olimpia)

 1 goal:

  Romell Quioto (Vida)
  David Meza (Platense)
  Marcelo dos Santos (Motagua)
  Luis Castro (Vida)
  Julián Rápalo (Deportes Savio)
  Brayan Beckeles (Vida)
  Mario Berríos (Marathón)
  Carlos Mejía (Marathón)
  Oscar Durón (Necaxa)
  Carlos Morán (Victoria)
  Wilmer Crisanto (Victoria)
  Mariano Acevedo (Marathón)
  Alexander Aguilar (Platense)
  Angel Hill (Hispano)
  Bruno da Silva (Victoria)
  Jorge Lozano (Vida)
  Elroy Kuylen (Platense)
  Víctor Mena (Victoria)
  Marvin Sánchez (Vida)
  Fabio Ulloa (Necaxa)
  Edwin Salvador (Necaxa)
  Léster Macías (Hispano)
  Bani Lozano (Olimpia)
  Aly Arriola (Motagua)
  Rommel Murillo (Vida)
  Dixon Mauricio (Necaxa)
  Franco Güity (Olimpia)
  Elder Valladares (Marathón)
  Jesús Navas (Necaxa)
  Pablo Genovese (Hispano)
  Quiarol Arzú (Platense)
  Charles Córdoba (Motagua)
  Roger Mondragón (Motagua)
  Francisco López (Deportes Savio)
  Carlos Navarro (Hispano)
  Ney Costa (Deportes Savio)
  Milton Palacios (Marathón)
  Jairo Crisanto (Victoria)
  Vicente Solórzano (Deportes Savio)
  Gustavo Alvarado (Motagua)
  Johnny Leverón (Motagua)

 1 own-goal:

  Johny Galdámez (Deportes Savio)
  Sergio Bica (Real España)
  Erick Norales (Marathón)
  Elroy Smith (Deportes Savio)
  Francisco Díaz (Platense)
  Angel Hill (Hispano)
  Luis Mercado (Hispano)

Clausura
The Clausura tournament started on 15 January 2011 with the game between reigning champions Real C.D. España who played against C.D.S. Vida. The game ended with an unexpected 0–1 home defeat for Real España; Pompilio Cacho scored the first goal of the season.
On 16 March 2011, the league decided to switch rounds 14 and 15, thereby the local derbies from 26–27 March don't interfere with the Honduras national football team fixtures.
On 9 April 2011, C.D. Olimpia ensured its participation in the semifinals after defeating C.D. Marathón 0–1 at Estadio Francisco Morazán; C.D. Motagua did it on 17 April 2011 in La Ceiba against C.D. Victoria with a 1–2 away victory; and on the very last round, C.D.S. Vida and Marathón also joined to face C.D. Motagua and C.D. Olimpia on the semifinals respectively. On 30 April 2011, C.D. Motagua earned a ticket to the Final after a 3–3 draw on aggregate against C.D.S. Vida; C.D. Olimpia qualified against C.D. Marathón one day later. As a result, the contenders of the Honduran Superclásico faced each other again for the sixth time in a Final series in the history of the league. Motagua rectified its good performance and with a 5–3 aggregate score defeated its main rival and obtained its 12th league title.

Real España, Motagua and Olimpia earned berths to the 2011–12 CONCACAF Champions League.

Regular season

Standings

Results
 As of 20 April 2011

Final round

Semifinals

Olimpia vs Marathón

 Olimpia 1–1 Marathón on aggregate score; Olimpia advanced on better Regular season performance.

Motagua vs Vida

 Motagua 3–3 Vida on aggregate score; Motagua advanced on better Regular season performance

Final

Olimpia vs Motagua

 Motagua won 5–3 on aggregate score.

Top goalscorers
 As of 15 May 2011

 15 goals:

  Jerry Bengtson (Motagua)

 12 goals:

  Ney Costa (Deportes Savio)

 9 goals:

  Elmer Zelaya (Victoria)

 7 goals:

  Rolando López (Deportes Savio)
  Óscar Torlacoff (Hispano)

 6 goals:

  Julio Rodríguez (Real España)
  Eddie Hernández (Platense)

 5 goals:

  Roger Rojas (Olimpia)
  Nery Medina (Necaxa)
  Ramiro Bruschi (Olimpia)
  Francisco Pavón (Vida)
  Rony Flores (Marathón)
  Amado Guevara (Motagua)
  Charles Córdoba (Necaxa)
  Douglas Caetano (Olimpia)

 4 goals:

  Mitchel Rivera (Platense)
  Carlos Oliva (Victoria)
  Emil Martínez (Marathón)
  Pompilio Cacho (Vida)

 3 goals:

  Harrison Róches (Necaxa)
  Melvin Valladares (Real España)
  Alexander Aguilar (Platense)
  Jocimar Nascimento (Vida)
  José Pacini (Platense)
  Samir Arzú (Victoria)
  Óscar Durón (Necaxa)
  Pablo Genovese (Vida)
  Mario Martínez (Real España)
  Javier Portillo (Vida)
  Saul Martínez (Victoria)
  Guillermo Ramírez (Motagua)

 2 goals:

  Román Castillo (Vida)
  Jorge Ramírez (Real España)
  Óscar García (Olimpia)
  Rubén Licona (Necaxa)
  Juan Cárcamo (Platense)
  Orvin Paz (Marathón)
  Gerson Rodas (Real España)
  Julián Rápalo (Deportes Savio)
  Edder Delgado (Real España)
  Sergio Mendoza (Motagua)
  Fernando Castillo (Marathón)
  Adán Ramírez (Motagua)
  Carlos Mejía (Marathón)
  Reynaldo Tilguath (Olimpia)
  Víctor Morales (Hispano)
  Milton Ruiz (Vida)
  Rommel Murillo (Vida)
  Rubén Matamoros (Necaxa)

 1 goal:

  Marvin Sánchez (Necaxa)
  Steven Jiménez (Victoria)
  Erick Norales (Marathón)
  Fredixon Elvir (Olimpia)
  Eder Arias (Platense)
  Jairo Róchez (Victoria)
  Franco Güity (Olimpia)
  Henry Martínez (Real España)
  Kurt Cárcamo (Marathón)
  Víctor Ortiz (Victoria)
  Danilo Turcios (Olimpia)
  Johnny Leverón (Motagua)
  Mario Girón (Motagua)
  Juan Mejía (Deportes Savio)
  Maynor Martínez (Real España)
  Astor Henríquez (Marathón)
  Fábio de Souza (Olimpia)
  Edilson Pereira (Marathón)
  Bani Lozano (Olimpia)
  Irbin Guerrero (Deportes Savio)
  Sergio Bica (Real España)
  Henry Acosta (Hispano)
  José Discua (Hispano)
  Jorge Claros (Motagua)
  Johnny Calderón (Olimpia)
  Víctor Mena (Victoria)
  Carlos Sánchez (Marathón)
  Milton Palacios (Victoria)
  Leonardo Morales (Hispano)
  Claudio Cardozo (Marathón)
  Félix Crisanto (Victoria)
  Héctor Patiño (Deportes Savio)
  Mauricio Copete (Motagua)
  Francisco López (Deportes Savio)
  Carlos Solórzano (Platense)
  Alexander López (Olimpia)
  Sergio Diduch (Hispano)
  Dany Pineda (Hispano)
  Carlos Morán (Motagua)
  David Meza (Platense)
  Leonardo Isaula (Necaxa)
  Luis Santamaría (Marathón)
  Pedro Domínguez (Hispano)
  Luis Lobo (Real España)
  Diego Rodríguez (Real España)
  Fabio Ulloa (Necaxa)
  Jesús Navas (Necaxa)
  Christian Altamirano (Vida)
  Luis Castro (Vida)

 1 own-goal:

  Henry Acosta (Hispano)
  Carlos Pérez (Necaxa)
  Astor Henríquez (Marathón)
  Douglas Mattoso (Olimpia)
  Mario Padilla (Deportes Savio)
  Vicente Solórzano (Deportes Savio)
  Jorge Lozano (Vida)

Aggregate table
Relegation was determined by the aggregated table of both Apertura and Clausura tournaments. On 17 April 2011 Hispano F.C. were mathematically relegated to the Liga de Ascenso after a 0–0 home draw against C.D. Marathón at Estadio Carlos Miranda. Hispano played 6 season at Liga Nacional since 2005–06.

References

External links
 Official website - LINA.hn

Liga Nacional de Fútbol Profesional de Honduras seasons
1
Honduras